Kamarabad-e Arnadi (also Romanized as Kamarābād-e Ārnadī; also known as Kamarābād-e Ārmandī) is a village in Kuh Mareh Sorkhi Rural District, Arzhan District, Shiraz County, Fars Province, Iran. At the 2006 census, its population was 285, in 47 families.

References 

Populated places in Shiraz County